Vietnam Veterans Memorial Highway may refer to:

Interstate 84 in Idaho
Interstate 84 in Oregon
Delaware Expressway
Interstate 95 in Pennsylvania between the Delaware state line and Interstate 295
Interstate 295 in Pennsylvania between the Scudder Falls Bridge and Interstate 95
U.S. Route 10 in Wisconsin
Interstate 89 in Vermont
Interstate 77 in Ohio

See also
 Veterans Highway
 Veterans Memorial Highway
 Veterans Memorial Parkway

Interstate 84 (Oregon–Utah)
Interstate 95
U.S. Route 10